Cotorro, or San Pedro del Cotorro, is one of the 15 municipalities (municipios in Spanish) in the city of Havana, Cuba.

Overview
The municipality is situated by the Carretera Central (Central Highway), and main autopista (motorway). Cotorro is 16 km from Old Havana. Its foundation dates to 1822. By the end of the 1950s, Cotorro had grown in such a way that it was exceeding in extension and population to the head of the municipality.

Twin towns – sister cities
 Campinas, Brazil

References

External links

Cotorro website
Cotorro cultural website

Municipalities of Havana